The South Fork Salmon River is a tributary of the Salmon River in Clackamas County in the U.S. state of Oregon.

The entire South Fork lies within the Salmon-Huckleberry Wilderness, which is part of Mount Hood National Forest. The South Fork's only named tributary is Mack Hall Creek, which enters from the right.

Open from late May to late September, the campground has sites for tents and recreational vehicles (RV)s, picnic tables, and access to hiking trails and trout fishing.

See also
 List of rivers of Oregon

References

External links
Sandy River Basin Watershed Council

Rivers of Oregon
Rivers of Clackamas County, Oregon
Mount Hood National Forest